The 1906 Tie Cup Final was the final match to decide the winner of the Tie Cup, the 4th. edition of the international competition organised by the Argentine and Uruguayan Associations together. For the fifth time since 1900, there were two Argentine teams in the final, Alumni and Belgrano A.C., both from the Belgrano neighborhood, that also had a strong rivalry.

The match was held in the former stadium of Quilmes Atlético Club (located on Guido and Sarmiento streets), on 30 August 1906. Alumni won its third Tie Cup trophy after beating Belgrano A.C. 10–1, the highest result in the history of the Tie Cup finals.

It was the last edition played under a group stage. Since 1907, the Tie Cup would be contested by the winners of the respective competitions in each country, Copa de Competencia Jockey Club (Argentina) and Copa de Competencia (Uruguay), playing a unique match to decide the champion.

Qualified teams

Overview 

Playing in a single-elimination tournament, Alumni beat Estudiantes (BA) 4–2 in Palermo, Reformer (3–2 in Campana), and then Belgrano Extra (presumibably a second team of Belgrano A.C.) 2–1 at Sociedad Sportiva Argentina. In the semifinals, Alumni defeated Uruguayan Montevideo Wanderers 2–0 at Estadio Gran Parque Central.

On the other hand, Belgrano beat San Isidro 6–0 as visitor, Quilmes (2–2 at San Martín, 5–3 in Quilmes), reaching the semifinal where the squad defeated Rosario Central 5–2 in Quilmes.

The final was played at Quilmes A.C. Stadium, and Alumni easily defeated Belgrano with a 10–1, achieving the highest score in a Tie Cup Final. Eliseo Brown was the keyplayer of the match, scoring 5 goals. According to media coverage, Alumni made a great performance, with the team showing coordinated movements (specially from its attacking players, who were absolutely effective showing great accuracy in their passing and shots).

Match details

References

T
T
1906 in Argentine football
Football in Buenos Aires Province